Kazi Hasibul Haque (born 27 October 1986 in Khulna) is a Bangladeshi former first-class cricketer active 2001–2005 who played for Khulna Division, Sylhet Division and Bangladesh Under-19s. He was a right-handed batsman and a wicket-keeper.

References

1986 births
Living people
Bangladeshi cricketers
Khulna Division cricketers
Sylhet Division cricketers
Wicket-keepers